Chat Garcia Ramilo (born 1960, Philippines) is a feminist activist. She has over twenty years experience  in different activities with Information and communications technology (ICT). Since April 2017, she leads the Association for Progressive Communications (APC). She is the Board Chair of the Center for Migrant Advocacy in the Philippines and a Board Member of the Association for Women's Rights in Development (AWID).

Career 
Garcia Ramilo is the Board Chair of the Center for Migrant Advocacy in the Philippines. She has served as a gender expert for various ICT for development initiatives. and institutions such as the World Bank and the United Nations Division for the Advancement of Women.

Chat Garcia Ramilo became the executive director of the Association for Progressive Communications  after serving as manager of its Communications Women's Rights Programme for seven years. She manages gender evaluation methodologies and she co-authored Gender Evaluation Methodologies for Internet and ICTs (GEM), which has been used by organisations in over 25 countries.

She is a co-founder of the Take Back the Tech! campaign, which addresses digital gender violence through technology.

Publications 
 Angela Kuga Thas, Chat Garcia Ramilo and Dafne Sabanes Plou, Facilitators Guide for GEM Workshops, Association for Progressive Communications (2010).
 Chat Ramilo and Cheekay Cinco. Gender and Evaluation Methodology for Internet and ICTs: A learning Tool for Change and Empowerment, APC Women's Networking Support Programme (2005).
 Chat Ramilo, Nancy Hafkin and Sonia Jorge. Gender equality and empowerment of women through ICT, United Nations Division for the Advancement of Women (2005).
 Chat Ramilo, Sonia Jorge and Wati Hermawati. Engendering Rural Information System in Indonesia, The World Bank, Rural Development and Natural Resources Unit, East Asia and the Pacific Region (2005).

References

External links 
 Association for Progressive Communications Women's Rights Programme
 AWID Women's Rights
 Center for Migrant Advocacy

Living people
1960 births
Filipino women's rights activists
Date of birth missing (living people)
Place of birth missing (living people)
Filipino human rights activists
Organization founders